East Branch Christina River is a  first-order tributary to the Christina River in New Castle County, Delaware in the United States.

Course

East Branch Christina River rises on the Christina River divide in Chester County, Pennsylvania and flows south into Cecil County, Maryland then southeast into New Castle County, Delaware meet the Christina River at Covered Bridge Farms.

Watershed
East Branch Christina River drains  of area, receives about 46.3 in/year of precipitation, has a topographic wetness index of 409.33 and is about 36.7% forested.

See also
List of Delaware rivers

Maps

References

Rivers of Delaware
Rivers of Maryland
Rivers of Pennsylvania
Rivers of New Castle County, Delaware
Rivers of Cecil County, Maryland
Rivers of Chester County, Pennsylvania
Tributaries of the Christina River